Francisco Higinio Andrade Marín (15 November 1841 – 6 September 1935) was Ecuadorian politician. He was Minister of Finance in 1894. He was President of the Chamber of Deputies in 1911. He was acting President of Ecuador from 6 March to 10 August 1912.

External links
 List of presidents of Ecuador, worldstatesmen.org
 Official Website of the Ecuadorian Government about the country President's History

References

1841 births
1935 deaths
People from Quito
Ecuadorian people of Galician descent
Presidents of Ecuador
Presidents of the Chamber of Deputies of Ecuador
Ecuadorian Ministers of Finance